In molecular biology, the transcriptional activator LAG-3 is a transcriptional activator protein. The C. elegans Notch pathway, involved in the control of growth, differentiation and patterning in animal development, relies on either of the receptors GLP-1 or LIN-12. Both these receptors promote signalling by the recruitment of LAG-3 to target promoters, where it then acts as a transcriptional activator. LAG-3 works as a ternary complex together with the DNA binding protein, LAG-1.

References 

Protein families